Peppa Pig is a British preschool animated television series by Astley Baker Davies. Its characters are listed below.

Cast

The Pigs
 Peppa Pig (voiced by Lily Snowden-Fine in series 1, Cecily Bloom in series 2, Harley Bird in series 3 to series 6, Amelie Bea Smith since series 6 and Sydney Patrick in the US Tickle-U version)  Peppa is a cheeky little pig and Mummy & Daddy Pig's daughter, George's sister, Granny & Grandpa Pig's granddaughter, Uncle and Auntie Pig's niece, Alexander & Chloe's cousin sister and the main character of the show. She is 4 years old. Her hobbies include jumping in muddy puddles, playing with her teddy bear, Teddy, going to playgroup, playing the computer game "Happy Mrs. Chicken", and playing dress up. She wears a signature red dress and black shoes. When she jumps in puddles, she wears her golden boots (referred to as yellow by Suzy). She is the only character to appear in every episode. Her best friend is Suzy Sheep, but once stopped being friends for a while. All of the pigs are pink. Her best friend in-law is confirmed to be Rebecca Rabbit. However unlike with Suzy Sheep. Peppa has called her best friend in-law Rebecca Rabbit "Her friend" on many occasions rather than "Her best friend in-law".
 George Pig (voiced by Oliver May and Alice May in serIes 1–5, Alice May and Vincent van Hulzen in series 6–)  George is Peppa's younger brother, Mummy & Daddy Pig's son, Granny & Grandpa Pig's grandson, Uncle & Auntie Pig's nephew and Alexander & Chloe's cousin brother. He is often seen in possession of his toy dinosaur, named "Mr. Dinosaur", but due to George's limited vocabulary, he pronounces it as "dine-saw," which was given to him as a present by Grandpa and Granny Pig when he was born, as shown in the episode The Olden Days. He cries in several episodes with his trademark showers of tears and very loud crying sounds. Often when he cries it has to do with Peppa teasing him or him being afraid of something. He is the only one in Peppa's playgroup whose name does not start with the same letter as his species. Also, in the series, he is referred to as just "George". He is now a member of Peppa's class despite being only two years old (presumably 3 by season 7) He wears a blue shirt and black shoes. He shares many similarities with his dad such as drinking hot milk and making chocolate cakes or cookies. His best friend is Richard Rabbit and his best friend in-law is confirmed to be Pedro Pony. However unlike with Richard Rabbit, George has called his best friend in-law Pedro Pony "Friend" on many occasions rather than "Best friend in-law".
 Mummy Pig (voiced by Morwenna Banks)  Mummy Pig is Daddy Pig's wife, Grandpa & Granny Pig's daughter, Auntie Pig's and Uncle Pig's sister-in-law, Peppa & George's mother, and Cousin Chloe and Alexander's aunt. She is home employed and works on a computer. She also works as a volunteer firefighter with the Mummies' Fire Service. She has skill in literacy and worked as an author in series 5, writing the book "Funny Onion", which is really just one long number due to "printing issues". She wears an orange dress.
 Daddy Pig (voiced by Richard Ridings, Oscar Cheda in the US Tickle-U) and Andrew Macheca in the pitch pilot)  Daddy Pig is Mummy Pig's husband, Granny & Grandpa Pig's son in-law, Uncle Pig's brother, Auntie Pig's brother in-law, Alexander & Chloe's uncle, and Peppa & George's father. He wears glasses due to his poor eyesight. Unlike Mummy Pig's parents, Grandpa Pig and Granny Pig, Daddy Pig's parents have never been shown or heard of in the series. Daddy Pig shows signs of illiteracy and has issues with map reading, too. Despite this, he remains jolly and never lets anything get him down, even when Mr. Potato openly insults him on his TV show, which the whole town appears to watch. Peppa Pig, George Pig, Mummy Pig, and almost everybody else calls Daddy Pig fat, because Daddy Pig has a big tummy, but Daddy Pig doesn't let that bother him. He is also shown to have acrophobia, a fear of heights. He works as a structural engineer, and a concrete technician. He wears a turquoise (referred to as green by him) shirt.
 Grandpa Pig (voiced by David Graham and Heath Kelts in the US Tickle-U version)  Grandpa Pig is Mummy & Auntie Pig's father, Granny Pig's husband, Daddy & Uncle Pig's father-in-law and Peppa, George, Alexander & Chloe's grandfather. Although the two bicker and fight in a few episodes, he is best friends with Granddad Dog. He has a trackless train named Gertrude and calling it a toy train quickly angers him, claiming that "Gertrude is not a toy, she is a miniature locomotive!". He loves sailing and gardening. Some garden features, however, such as chickens eating his lettuces, blackberry bushes looking at him, garden gnomes, and plastic wells tend to anger him. He is often seen wearing a white sailing cap with a blue anchor on the front. He always wears an indigo shirt.
 Granny Pig (voiced by Frances White and Nanique Gheridan in the US Tickle-U version)  Granny Pig is Grandpa Pig's wife, Mummy & Auntie Pig's mother, Daddy & Uncle Pig's mother in-law, Peppa, George, Alexander & Chloe's grandmother. She is a fan of perfume. She grows apples in an orchard near her house along with vegetables in her own garden next to her house. She also has four pet chickens that often annoy Grandpa Pig.
 Uncle Pig (voiced by John Sparkes) – Uncle Pig is Daddy Pig's older brother, Mummy Pig's brother in-law, Grandpa & Granny Pig's son in-law, Alexander & Chloe's father, Peppa & George's uncle and Auntie Pig's husband. He has a "big tummy" like Daddy Pig. He shares many similarities with his younger brother, Daddy Pig.
 Auntie Pig (voiced by Alison Snowden in series 1 to series 2 and Judy Flynn in series 3, 4 & 6)  Auntie Pig is Uncle Pig's wife, Mummy Pig and Daddy Pig's sister in-law, Peppa & George's aunt, and Alexander & Chloe's mother. She wears a pink polka-dotted dress.
 Chloe Pig (voiced by Eloise May in series 1–2, Abigail Daniels in series 3, Zara Siddiqi in series 4 and Charlotte Potterton since series 6)  Chloe is Auntie & Uncle Pig's daughter, Granny & Grandpa Pig's granddaughter, Peppa & George's cousin, Mummy & Daddy Pig's niece and Alexander's older sister. Her best friends are Belinda Bear & Simon Squirrel and they like to tease Peppa. She is 8 years old (10 by the events of Season 6) and wears a yellow dress. Since she is older than the other kids, she does not go to Peppa's playgroup and instead is presumed to go to a different school. She and her family did not appear at all in series 5, but they return to series 6.
 Baby Alexander (voiced by Oliver May in series 2, Harley Bird in series 3 and Minnie Kennedy-Parr since series 4)  Alexander is Auntie & Uncle Pig's son, Grandpa & Granny Pig's grandson, Chloe's brother, Peppa & George's cousin brother and Mummy & Daddy Pig's nephew. His first word was "puddles", taught to him by Peppa.
 Auntie Dottie Pig  Auntie Dottie Pig is Peppa and George's aunt who sent a toy horse, which Peppa and George call "Horsey Twinkle Toes". She is only mentioned and never seen or heard. She is presumed to be the sister of Mummy Pig and the daughter of Granny & Grandpa Pig. She is also presumed to wear a dress with a dot-style pattern.

The Rabbits
 Rebecca Rabbit (voiced by Hazel Rudd in series 1, Bethan Lindsay in series 2, Alice May in series 3–4 and Arisha Choudhary in series 5–)  Rebecca is Daddy & Mummy Rabbit's daughter, Richard, Rosie & Robbie's older sister, Miss Rabbit's niece and Peppa's friend from playgroup, She is Peppa's best friend in-law as confirmed in "Rebecca Rabbit" and is also the best friend in-law of Emily Elephant. She is the older sister of Richard and their twin baby sister and brother, Rosie & Robbie. She usually visits Peppa. She enjoys carrots very much and eats them very often and has dressed up like one. She wears a sky blue dress, and black shoes.
 Richard Rabbit (voiced by Zoe Baker in series 2–5, Rohan Boucher since series 6, Fin Templer since series 7 and Chloe Dolandis on Cartoon Network)  Richard is Daddy & Mummy Rabbit's son, Rebecca, Rosie & Robbie's brother, Miss Rabbit's nephew and George & Edmund's best friend. He has a fuss about things and in some episodes he is seen crying with George, albeit at a higher pitch. He has a toy dinosaur, that has been seen as both red and purple in different episodes. He wears a dark blue shirt and black shoes. His name later appears uncredited in series 7, though he is only given credit once in one episode from series 7.
 Rachel Rabbit (voiced by Carolyn Lawrence)  Rachel is Daddy & Mummy Rabbit's daughter, Rebecca, Richard, Rosie & Robbie's sister, and Miss Rabbit's niece. She wears a sky blue dress, and black shoes like Rebecca Rabbit. Her name is uncredited in the credits.
 Miss Rabbit (voiced by Sarah Ann Kennedy)  Miss Rabbit appears to have many jobs at the same time, including bus driver, supermarket assistant, librarian, helicopter pilot, firefighter, ice cream seller, shoe shop assistant, nurse, ticket seller, and more, but she loves her jobs. She is Mummy Rabbit's twin sister, Grampy Rabbit's daughter (as confirmed in 'Rescuing Miss Rabbit'), Daddy Rabbit's sister in-law and Rebecca, Richard, Rosie & Robbie's aunt. She wears a yellow dress, like her twin sister. Some people think there is more than one Miss Rabbit, which is confirmed in 'America' and again in 'Peppa Goes To Paris'), Her children and husband have never appeared in the show but it is assumed that they are rabbits, like her. Her name only appears uncredited in the credits once in Rebecca Rabbit's titular episode as her name was replaced by Mummy Rabbit's in this episode .
 Mummy Rabbit aka Mrs. Rabbit (voiced by Sarah Ann Kennedy)  Mummy Rabbit is Daddy Rabbit's wife, Grampy Rabbit's daughter, Rebecca, Richard, Rosie & Robbie's mother, and Miss Rabbit's twin sister. She does not appear as often as her sister. She wears a light yellow dress like Miss Rabbit. As confirmed in "Rebecca Rabbit" Mummy Rabbit is confirmed to be Mummy Pig's best friend in-law. Her name is uncredited in the credits. Though she is only given credit once in one episode .
 Daddy Rabbit aka Mr. Rabbit (voiced by John Sparkes)  Daddy Rabbit is Mummy Rabbit's husband, Rebecca, Richard, Rosie & Robbie's father and Miss Rabbit's brother in-law. He works with Daddy Pig and Mummy Cat in a top floor office. He appears to be a station master, manager of the museum and ice cream seller in some episodes. He has a Welsh accent, which is a pun on Welsh rarebit.
 Reginald "Reggie" Rabbit aka Grampy Rabbit (voiced by Brian Blessed)  Grampy Rabbit is Grandpa Pig & Granddad Dog's friend and Miss Rabbit & Mummy Rabbit's father, Rebecca, Richard, Rosie & Robbie's grandfather and Mademoiselle Lapin's husband. He can play the banjo and runs a boat yard as shown in "Grampy Rabbit's Boatyard". He has a very loud voice and often plays songs that the children enjoy but the adults somewhat dislike, In Sea Treasure, it was confirmed that he was called 'Little Reggie Rabbit' as a child and is 100 years of age.
 Mademoiselle Lapin aka Granny Rabbit (voiced by Sarah Ann Kennedy)  Mademoiselle Lapin is Miss Rabbit & Mummy Rabbit's mother, Rebecca, Richard, Rosie & Robbie's grandmother and Grampy Rabbit's wife. She first appeared in "Peppa Goes to Paris" She works in France and she has jobs like Miss Rabbit. She wears a yellow dress like her twin daughters and is 60 years of age. Her name is uncredited in the credits.
 Rosie & Robbie Rabbit (voiced by Minnie Kennedy-Parr)  Rosie & Robbie are Daddy & Mummy Rabbit's twin children, Grampy Rabbit's granddaughter and grandson, Rebecca and Richard's younger siblings and Miss Rabbit's niece & nephew. They were born in the episode "Mummy Rabbit's Bump". Their names were come up with by Peppa, Rebecca, Suzy, Pedro & George. Their names are uncredited in the credits.

Other Rabbits 

 Rita Rabbit  Rita is Rhett & Roselyn Rabbit's daughter, Roger's older sister. She has blonde fur and wears a light green dress like Mummy Dog and black shoes.
 Roger Rabbit (voiced by Oliver and Alice May)  Roger is Rhett & Roselyn Rabbit's son and Rita's brother. He has blonde fur and wears an orange shirt and black shoes. His name is uncredited in the credits.
 Roselyn Rabbit  Roselyn Rabbit is Rhett Rabbit's wife and Rita and Roger's mother. She strongly resembles Mummy Rabbit and Miss Rabbit in the same show. She wears a crismon red dress and black shoes.
 Rhett Rabbit  Rhett Rabbit is Roselyn Rabbit's husband, and Rita and Roger's father. He strongly resembles Daddy Rabbit in the same show. He wears the same outfit as him but in pictional blue, white, and purple colours and he has blonde fur like his wife, daughter, and son.
 Rayla Rabbit  Rayla Rabbit has brown fur and wears a purple shirt and black shoes.
 Russell Rabbit (voiced by Tom Kenny)  Russell is likely Daddy & Mummy Rabbit's son, Rebecca, Richard, Rosie & Robbie's brother, and Miss Rabbit's nephew. He has light gray fur and wears a turquoise shirt like Daddy Pig and black shoes. His name is uncredited in the credits.
 Roo Rabbit (voiced by Bill Fagerbakke)  Roo is likely Daddy & Mummy Rabbit's son, Rebecca, Richard, Rosie & Robbie's brother, and Miss Rabbit's nephew. He has dark gray fur and wears a blue shirt like George Pig and black shoes. His name is uncredited in the credits.
 Rica Rabbit (voiced by Mary Jo Catlett)  Rica is likely Daddy & Mummy Rabbit's daughter, Rebecca, Richard, Rosie & Robbie's sister, and Miss Rabbit's niece. She has dark gray fur and wears a pink dress and black shoes. Her name is uncredited in the credits.

The Sheep
 Suzy Sheep (voiced by Meg Hall in the UK version from series 1–4, Ava Lovell from series 5– in the UK and Elaine Torres on the American version that aired on Cartoon Network in 2005)  Suzy is Daddy & Mummy Sheep 's daughter, Charlotte Sheep's cousin, Granny Sheep's granddaughter, Shelby Sheep's niece and Peppa's best friend. She wears a pink dress and black shoes. And has an imaginary friend named Leo Lion in one episode. In some episodes she wears a nurse costume. She is allegedly bossy and keeps telling people what to do but she thinks Peppa is the one who is telling people what to do. She is the only child in the show to wear a similar shade of pink as her mum. She is Danny Dog's best friend in-law as confirmed in "Captain Daddy Dog". She is the only kid in the show whose father is never mentioned or seen. Her father might be dead as confirmed in the episode The Olden Days. Once, she and Peppa ended their friendship for a short while.[1]
 Mummy Sheep (voiced by Debbie Macdonald)  Mummy Sheep is Suzy's mother, Daddy Sheep's wife, Granny Sheep's daughter, Shelby Sheep's twin sister and Charlotte's aunt. She wears a hot pink dress. She is Mummy Pig's best friend and is also Mummy Dog's best friend in-law as confirmed in "Captain Daddy Dog".
 Charlotte Sheep (voiced by Mandeep Dhillon)  Charlotte is Suzy's cousin, Granny Sheep's granddaughter, Shelby Sheep's daughter and Mummy Sheep and Daddy Sheep's niece who is a teenager. She wears a yellow dress. She was first introduced in the episode, "In The Future".
 Daddy Sheep  Daddy Sheep is Suzy's father, Mummy Sheep's husband, Shelby Sheep's brother in-law, Granny Sheep's son in-law and Charlotte's uncle. Who died when Suzy was a baby as confirmed in the episode "The Olden Days". His appearance is not seen, due to an error in the episode.
 Granny Sheep (voiced by Morwenna Banks)  Granny Sheep is Suzy and Charlotte's grandmother, Daddy Sheep's mother in-law and Shelby Sheep & Mummy Sheep's mother. She wears a hot pink dress with flowers on it. She first appeared in "Dinosaur Party".
 Shelby Sheep (voiced by Carolyn Lawrence)  Shelby is Suzy's aunt, Daddy Sheep's sister-in-law, Mummy Sheep's sister, Charlotte's mother and Granny Sheep's daughter. She wears blue clothes like George Pig and black shoes. Her name is uncredited in the credits.

Other Sheep 

 Beck Sheep  Beck is Katelyn Sheep 's daughter. She wears a purple dress and black shoes and has black fur while Suzyhas white fur.
 Katelyn Sheep  Katelyn Sheep is Beck's mother. She wears a red dress like Peppa and black shoes.
 Barry Sheep (voiced by Tom Kenny)  Barry is likely Daddy & Mummy Sheep 's son. He has dark gray fur and wears a dark green shirt and black shoes. His name is uncredited in the credits.
 Katie Sheep (voiced by Jill Talley)  Katie is likely Daddy & Mummy Sheep 's second daughter. She has light gray fur and wears a light yellow dress and black shoes. Her name is uncredited in the credits.

The Cats
 Candy Cat (voiced by Daisy Rudd in series 1, Emma Weston in series 2, Zara Siddiqi in series 3–4, Madison Turner in series 5 and Tallulah Conabeare in series 6 onwards) – Candy is one of Peppa's friends and is also Emily Elephant's best friend. She wears a turquoise dress and black shoes.
 Mrs. Cat aka Mummy Cat (voiced by Morwenna Banks in series 2, Leila Farzad in series 3–4 and Judy Flynn in series 5–)  Mummy Cat is Daddy Cat's wife, Candy's mother and a co-worker of Daddy Pig and Daddy Rabbit. She is 33 years old according to the episode "Dr. Hamster's Tortoise". She wears a light red dress. According to the episode "Daddy Pig's Office", she is a graphic designer.
 Mr. Cat aka Daddy Cat (voiced by John Sparkes)  Daddy Cat is Mummy Cat's husband and Candy's father. He is often seen in series 3 and 4. He wears an indigo shirt and has dark fur. His name is uncredited in the credits.

The Dogs
 Danny Dog (voiced by George Woolford in series 1–2, Jadon Mills in series 3–4, Joshua Morris in series 5 and Charlie Stewart in series 6)  Danny is Mummy Dog & Captain Dog's son, Daisy & Dennis Dog's older brother, Granddad & Granny Dog's grandson, Dahlia's nephew and Peppa's friend and Pedro's best friend and also Suzy's best friend in-law as confirmed in "Captain Daddy Dog". He wants to be a pirate when he is older, possibly due to his father and grandfathers' sailing habits. He wears purple clothes and black shoes and has dark brown fur.
 Daisy Dog (voiced by Oliver and Alice May)  Daisy is Mummy Dog & Captain Dog's daughter, Danny Dog's younger sister, Dennis Dog's sister, Dahlia Dog's niece and Granddad & Granny Dog's granddaughter. She wears purple clothes and black shoes and has dark brown fur like Danny Dog. Her name is uncredited in the credits.
 Dennis Dog (voiced by Oliver and Alice May)  Dennis is Mummy Dog & Captain Dog's twin son, Danny Dog's younger brother, Daisy Dog's brother, Dahlia Dog's twin nephew and Granddad & Granny Dog's grandson. He wears red clothes and black shoes and has dark brown fur. His name is uncredited in the credits.
 Mummy Dog a.k.a. Mrs. Dog (voiced by Debbie MacDonald in series 1, Claire Waxler in series 2 and Judy Flynn in series 4, 5 & 6)  Mummy Dog is Captain Dog's wife, Danny, Dennis, and Daisy's mother, Shelby's sister and Granddad & Granny Dog's daughter in-law. As confirmed in "Captain Daddy Dog" Mummy Dog is Mummy Sheep's best friend in-law.
 Granddad Dog (voiced by David Rintoul)  Granddad Dog is Captain Dog's father, Shelby Dog & Mummy Dog's father in-law, Danny, Dennis, and Daisy's grandfather and Granny Dog's husband. He is a mechanic and is very good at fixing cars. Even though they sometimes bicker about whose boat is better, Granddad Dog and Grandpa Pig are best friends.
 Daddy Dog aka Captain Dog (voiced by Alexander Armstrong)  Captain Dog is Mummy Dog's husband, Danny, Dennis, and Daisy's father and Granddad & Granny Dog's son. He was once a sailor and sea captain who traveled the world to make his fortune and thus was gone from home for most of the series. He was one of the last characters make his debut on the show, not appearing until the middle of series four when he retires from sailing and returns home to be with his family. Despite being retired, he often misses his life as a sailor.
 Granny Dog (voiced by Judy Flynn)  Granny dog is Granddad Dog's wife, Captain Dog's mother, Shelby Dog & Mummy Dog's mother in-law and Danny, Dennis, and Daisy's grandmother. She made her first appearance as Granny Pig's friend in episode "Vikings Day".
 Shelby Dog (voiced by Carolyn Lawrence)  Shelby is Danny, Dennis, and Daisy's aunt, Mummy Dog's sister, Daddy Dog's sister-in-law and Granddad & Granny Dog's daughter-in-law. She wears purple clothes like Danny Dog. Her name is uncredited in the credits.

Other Dogs 
 Daniel Dog (voiced by Harley Bird) Daniel is likely Mummy Dog & Captain Dog's son, Daisy & Dennis Dog's older brother, and Granddad & Granny Dog's grandson. He wears blue clothes like George and black shoes. His name is uncredited in the credits.

The Ponies
 Pedro Pony (voiced by Harrison Oldroyd in series 1–2, Stanley Nickless in series 3–4, Sammy Price in The Golden Boots and Around the World with Peppa, Rohal Soomro in series 5 and Robyn Elwell in series 6-)  Pedro is Mummy & Daddy Pony's son, Pearl, Paula, and Perry Pony's older brother, Peppa's friend, Danny Dog's best friend and George's best friend in-law as confirmed in 2 episodes which are "The Eye Test" and "Mummy Rabbit's Bump". He wears black eyeglasses, yellow clothes and black shoes. Characterized by his love for sleep, Pedro can be occasionally forgetful or clumsy and slow to catch on but is otherwise knowledgeable in his areas of interest and always friendly. In many episodes he is late for playgroup. In the episode "The School Play", Peppa kissed Pedro after their play ended. He is known for often wearing the wrong costume, as in the episode "Gymnastics" where he wears a superhero costume instead of his gym costume. He also is often found wearing a cowboy costume. He was the only kid in Peppa's playgroup who wears glasses before Molly Mole debuts. It's implied that he has a crush on Peppa.
 Pearl Pony (voiced by Carolyn Lawrence)  Pearl is Mummy & Daddy Pony's daughter, Pedro Pony's younger sister and Paula and Perry Pony's twin sister. She wears yellow clothes and black shoes like Pedro Pony. Her name is uncredited in the credits.
 Paula Pony (voiced by Lori Alan)  Paula is Mummy & Daddy Pony's twin daughter, Pedro Pony's younger twin sister and Pearl and Perry Pony's twin sister. She wears blue clothes and black shoes like George Pig. Her name is uncredited in the credits.
 Perry Pony (voiced by Rodger Bumpass)  Perry is Mummy & Daddy Pony's twin son, Pedro Pony's younger brother and Pearl and Paula Pony's twin brother. She wears piction blue clothes and black shoes. His name is uncredited in the credits.
 Mummy Pony aka Mrs. Pony (voiced by Kate Gribble in series 1, Madeleine May in series 2, Layla Lewis in series 2, Jemima Williams in series 3, Leila Farzad in series 4 and Judy Flynn since series 5)  Mummy Pony is Daddy Pony's wife and Pedro, Pearl, Perry, and Paula's mother. She wears a dark yellow dress. Her name later appears uncredited in the credits in season 5, 6, & 7.
 Daddy Pony aka Dr. Pony (voiced by John Sparkes)  Daddy Pony is Mummy Pony's husband and Pedro, Pearl, Perry, and Paula's father. He is professionally an optician. He wears glasses and green clothes.

Other Ponies 

 Penny Pony  Penny is Mother Pony's daughter and Priscilla Pony's older sister. She has bright skin and wears a baby green dress and black shoes.
 Priscilla Pony (voiced by Jill Talley)  Priscilla is Mother Pony's daughter and Penny Pony's younger sister. She wears light green clothes and black shoes like Mummy Dog. Her name is uncredited in the credits.
 Mother Pony  Mother Pony is  Penny and Priscilla's mother. She wears a light green dress like Mummy Dog.

The Zebras
 Zoe Zebra (voiced by Sian Taylor in series 2–4, Isla Gudgeon in series 5, Georgia Coates since series 6 and Tallulah Conabeare since series 7)  Zoe is a daughter of Mummy Zebra and Daddy Zebra. Her twin little sisters are Baby Zuzu and Baby Zaza and third one called Zara Zebra and a little brother called Zayne Zebra. She is a student of the Playgroup, where Peppa and her friends study. Her father is a postman. Her best friend is Rebecca Rabbit who is the best friend in-law of Peppa.
 Mummy Zebra aka Mrs Zebra (voiced by Morwenna Banks)  Mummy Zebra is Daddy Zebra's wife and Zoe, Zayne, Zara, and Zuzu & Zaza's mother. She wears a bright green dress and has shown to work with pottery in the episode "Pottery". She shares many similarities with Mummy Cow.
 Daddy Zebra aka Postman Mr. Zebra (voiced by David Graham)  Daddy Zebra is Mummy Zebra's husband and Zoe, Zayne, Zara, Zuzu & Zaza's father. He is professionally a postman. He can play the piano as shown in "Sleepover" and plays "Twinkle Twinkle Little Star" to make Peppa and her friends fall asleep.
 Zuzu & Zaza Zebra (voiced by Alice May from series 2–4, Matilda Green since series 5, and Flo Templer since series 7)  Zuzu & Zaza are Mummy & Daddy Zebra's twin children and Zoe, Zara, and Zayne's twin sisters. They are also George's friends. They both wear light pink dresses and black shoes. They are somewhat younger than George, Richard, and Edmond, and they do not appear at playgroup. Though they started playgroup in "Parachute Games". Their names later appear uncredited in series 7, though they are only given credit once in one episode from series 7.
 Zara Zebra (voiced by Carolyn Lawrence)  Zara is Mummy & Daddy Zebra's fourth daughter and Zoe, Zuzu & Zaza, and Zayne's twin sisters. She wears a grass green dress and black shoes. Her name is uncredited in the credits.
 Zayne Zebra (voiced by Oliver and Alice May)  Zayne is Mummy & Daddy Zebra's son and Zoe, Zara, and Zuzu & Zaza's brother. He wears a bright green shirt and black shoes. His name is uncredited in the credits.

The Elephants
 Emily Elephant (voiced by Julia Moss in the UK from series 2–4, Stara Bal since series 5 and Chloe Dolandis on Cartoon Network)  Emily is Daddy & Mummy Elephant's daughter, Granny and Granddad Elephant's granddaughter, Edmond, Elsa, and Etta's sister, Candy Cat's best friend and Peppa's friend from playgroup. She made her first appearance in the episode "Emily Elephant". She can make the loudest sound out of all the children and often uses her trunk as an extra hand. She wears a dark yellow dress and black shoes and is shy most of the time.
 Edmond Elephant (voiced by Jonny Butler from series 3–4 and Victor Wade since series 5)  Edmond is Daddy & Mummy Elephant's son, Emily, Elsa, and Etta's brother, Granny and Granddad Dog's grandson and George & Richard's friend. He is 2 year old, like George and Richard. Unlike George, Richard, and the other toddlers, Edmond is highly intelligent and can speak in full sentences; his high intelligence likely comes from his father. Because of this, Edmond is a self-proclaimed clever clogs. Edmond is so knowledgeable that he even beats adults in topics of knowledge. For example, in the episode, "Science Museum", he explains pulleys and static energy better than Miss Rabbit. Despite this, he as well has toddler traits; he has fun, giggles, and cries when unhappy. Edmond’s voice appears on the Peppa Pig Rocket kiddie ride. He wears a dark green shirt and black shoes. He was a background character in the episode “Mr. Potato Comes to Town”.
 Elsa Elephant (voiced by Carolyn Lawrence) Elsa is Daddy & Mummy Elephant's daughter, Granny and Granddad Elephant's granddaughter and Emily, Edmond, and Etta's sister. She wears light green clothes and black shoes like Etta Elephant. Her name is uncredited in the credits.
 Etta Elephant (voiced by Carolyn Lawrence) Etta is Daddy & Mummy Elephant's daughter, Granny and Granddad Elephant's granddaughter and Emily, Edmond, and Etta's sister. She wears light green clothes and black shoes like Elsa Elephant. Her name is uncredited in the credits.
 Dr. Elephant aka Daddy Elephant (voiced by Andy Hamilton)  Daddy Elephant is Mummy Elephant's husband, Granny and Granddad Elephant's son in-law and Emily's, Edmond, Elsa, and Etta's father. He is professionally a dentist. He wears a white shirt and red bow tie. He is very knowledgeable.
 Mummy Elephant aka Mrs. Elephant (voiced by Morwenna Banks)  Mummy Elephant is Daddy Elephant's wife, Granny and Granddad Elephant's daughter and Emily's, Edmond, Elsa, and Etta's mother. She wears a light purple dress. Her name is uncredited in the credits.
 Granny Elephant (voiced by Jen Pringle)  Granny Elephant is Mummy Elephant's mother, Daddy Elephant's mother in-law and Emily, Edmond, Elsa, and Etta's grandmother. She made her first appearance as Granny Pig's friend in episode "Hippies".
 Granddad Elephant (voiced by John Sparkes)  Granddad Elephant is Mummy Elephant's father, Daddy Elephant's father in-law and Emily, Edmond, Elsa, and Etta's grandfather. He wears a grayish red shirt and black shoes and dark red eyeglasses.

Other Elephants 

 Enzo Elephant (voiced by Rodger Bumpass)  Enzo is likely Daddy & Mummy Elephant's son and Emily, Edmond, Elsa, and Etta's sister. He has dark gray skin and wears baby blue clothes like Carol Cow and black shoes. His name is uncredited in the credits.

The Foxes
 Freddy Fox (voiced by Max Miller in series 3, Jamie Oram from series 4-5 and Charlie Stewart since series 6)  Freddy is Mummy & Daddy Fox's son, Felicity & Frida Fox's older brother and Peppa's friend who has a very good sense of smell. He wants to be a policeman when he grows up and often impersonates their sirens loudly. He wears a dark red shirt and black shoes.
 Felicity Fox (voiced by Oliver and Alice May)  Felicity is Mummy & Daddy Fox's daughter, Freddy Fox's younger sister and Frida Fox's twin sister. She wears dark red clothes and black shoes like Freddy Fox. Her name is uncredited in the credits.
 Frida Fox (voiced by Oliver and Alice May)  Felicity is Mummy & Daddy Fox's daughter, Freddy Fox's younger sister and Frida Fox's twin sister. She wears light pink clothes and black shoes like Zuzu & Zaza Zebra. Her name is uncredited in the credits.
 Mr. Fox aka Daddy Fox (voiced by John Sparkes)  Daddy Fox is Mummy Fox's husband, Freddy, Frida, and Felicity's father and the owner of a shop and a van that sells literally everything, from rocket engines to cement mixer. The things he sells are usually in boxes of five, but sometimes as matching sets of three.
 Mrs. Fox aka Mummy Fox (voiced by Judy Flynn)  Mummy Fox is Daddy Fox's wife and Freddy, Frida, and Felicity's mother. She works as a nurse as shown in the episode "Hospital". She wears a light yellow dress. A little is known about her compared to her son and husband. Her name is uncredited in the credits.

The Kangaroos
 Kylie Kangaroo (voiced by Macey Danger in her first appearance episode and Finley Grieg-Byrne since series 5)  Kylie is Daddy & Mummy Kangaroo's daughter, Joey's sister and Peppa's friend. She first appeared in an episode of her name. Since she is a kangaroo, she can jump higher than the others. She lives in Australia, near the Outback. She sometimes goes in picnics with her family and Peppa's family.
 Joey Kangaroo (voiced by Jazlyn Jago since series 5)  Joey is Daddy & Mummy Kangaroo's son and Kylie's brother. He stays in Mummy Kangaroo's pouch and is presumably as young as Baby Alexander. He has a toy crocodile similarly to how George has a dinosaur.
 Mummy Kangaroo aka Mrs. Kangaroo (voiced by Morwenna Banks in Kylie's episode and Elise Grieg since series 5)  Mummy Kangaroo is Daddy Kangaroo's wife and Kylie & Joey's mother. She works as a marine biologist and visits ocean life in a submarine for her job, as seen in the episode "The Great Barrier Reef".
 Daddy Kangaroo aka Mr. Kangaroo (voiced by Alexander Armstrong in Kylie's episode and Tony Byrne since series 5)  Daddy Kangaroo is Mummy Kangaroo's husband and Kylie & Joey's father. He likes barbecuing corn on the cob and surfing with his family.

The Wolves
 Wendy Wolf (voiced by Chaniya Mahon in series 4-5 and Eve Ridley since series 6)  Wendy Wolf is Mummy & Daddy Wolf's daughter, Granny Wolf's granddaughter, Wyatt and Winter Wolf's older sister and Peppa's friend after Daddy Pig designs a house for the wolves and Mr. Bull builds it. She also becomes a new student in Peppa's playgroup later in the series. She wears a somewhat darker shade of lilac dress. She is occasionally seen with a younger brother who wears an orange shirt, although he is never mentioned or named. Although her brother is known to be named Wyatt Wolf.
 Wyatt Wolf (voiced by Oliver and Alice May)  Wyatt is Mummy & Daddy Wolf's son, Granny Wolf's grandson, Wendy Wolf's younger brother, and Winter Wolf's brother. He wears an orange shirt and black shoes. His name is uncredited in the credits.
 Winter Wolf (voiced by Jill Talley)  Winter is Mummy & Daddy Wolf's daughter, Granny Wolf's granddaughter, Wendy Wolf's younger sister, and Wyatt Wolf's sister. He wears a purple dress and black shoes. Her name is uncredited in the credits.
 Mr. Wolf aka Daddy Wolf (voiced by Alexander Armstrong since series 5)  Daddy Wolf is Mummy Wolf's husband, Granny Wolf's son in-law and Wendy, Winter, and Wyatt's father. Not much is known about him compared to the other parents, although he does intimidate the pigs somewhat as a running joke, since the Big Bad Wolf and pigs are enemies in the story of The Three Little Pigs.
 Mrs. Wolf aka Mummy Wolf (voiced by Jen Pringle since series 4)  Mummy Wolf is Daddy Wolf's wife, Granny Wolf's daughter and Wendy, Winter, and Wyatt's mother. Like her husband, not much is known about her.
 Granny Wolf (voiced by Jen Pringle since series 4)  Granny Wolf is Mummy Wolf's mother, Daddy Wolf's mother in-law and Wendy, Winter, and Wyatt's grandmother. She made her first appearance in the episode "Wendy Wolf's Birthday".

The Goats
 Gabriella Goat (voiced by Sonia Arapi)  Gabriella is Signora and Signor's daughter, Uncle & Auntie Goat's niece and Peppa's friend who lives in Italy. She gives Peppa and her family a tour of the village where she lives when Peppa visits Italy. She wears a turquoise dress just like Rebecca and Candy and black shoes.
 Signor Goat (voiced by Andrea Tran)  Signor is Gabriella's father, Signora Goat's husband, Uncle Goat's brother in-law, Auntie Goat's brother and the caretaker of the holiday house where Peppa and her family live for holiday.
 Uncle Goat (voiced by John Sparkes)  Uncle Goat is Auntie Goat's husband, Gabriella's uncle, Signora and Signor's brother in-law and a pizza baker in Gabriella's village.
 Auntie Goat (voiced by Morwenna Banks)  Auntie Goat is Uncle Goat's wife, Gabriella's aunt, Signora's sister-in-law and Signor's sister. She runs a store in Gabriella's town.
 Signora Goat aka Mummy Goat (voiced by Amy Adams)  Signora Goat is Gabriella's mother, Signor Goat's wife and Uncle and Auntie Goat's sister-in-law who first appeared in "The Carnival". Her name is uncredited in the credits.

The Giraffes
 Gerald Giraffe (voiced by Leo Templer and planned to be voiced by Dexter Varrall in newer seasons)  Gerald Giraffe is Daddy & Mummy Giraffe's son, Grandpa Giraffe's grandson and Peppa's new friend from playgroup who first appeared in the episode "Gerald Giraffe". He is the tallest kid in the playgroup as he is a giraffe.
 Mr. Giraffe aka Daddy Giraffe (voiced by Zeus Jahn-Vilnur)  Daddy Giraffe is Mummy Giraffe's husband, Grandpa Giraffe's son in-law and Gerald Giraffe's father who works as a zookeeper and is responsible for looking after butterflies, as seen in the episode "The Zoo". He is the tallest character in the series.
 Mrs. Giraffe aka Mummy Giraffe (voiced by Posher Ra Ra)  Mummy Giraffe is Daddy Giraffe's wife, Grandpa Giraffe's daughter and Gerald Giraffe's mother. She is the tallest mother in the series, although she is not as tall as her husband.
 Grandpa Giraffe (voiced by John Sparkes)  Grandpa Giraffe is Mummy Giraffe's father, Daddy Giraffe's father in-law and Gerald Giraffe's grandfather. He wears a bluish-black shirt and black shoes.

The Moles
 Molly Mole (voiced by Rosie van Hulzen)  Molly is Mummy & Daddy Mole's daughter and Peppa's friend who first appeared in the Series 5 episode "Molly Mole". She wears glasses and is very good at digging. In her debut episode, her family moves underneath the rabbits, and she becomes best friends with Rebecca, though this is not often emphasized in the series. Molly is also Rebecca's second best friend on the playgroup, with her first best friend presumably being Zoe. As confirmed in "Children's Festival" Her biological best friend is confirmed to be Gerald Giraffe. She wears a light purple dress just like Zoe and black shoes.
 Mummy Mole aka Mrs. Mole (voiced by Jen Pringle)  Mummy Mole is Daddy Mole's wife and Molly's mother who is likewise good at digging.
 Daddy Mole aka Mr. Mole (voiced by John Sparkes)  Daddy Mole is Mummy Mole's husband and Molly's father who is likewise good at digging. He and Mummy Mole dug out their residence underneath the Rabbits.

The Bears
 Dr. Brown Bear (voiced by David Rintoul)  Brown Bear is a doctor, Belinda & Baby Bear's father, and Mummy Bear's husband. In the episode "Pedro's Cough", he claims he never gets sick, but he does when he caught Pedro's cough. According to the British Medical Journal, Dr. Brown Bear shows clear signs of "burnout" and begins falling short of the high standards of service he aims to provide to his patients, which include "prompt and direct telephone access, continuity of care, extended hours, and a low threshold for home visits", including using a "green light car... with sirens" to attend a playgroup where a 3 year old pony has coughed 3 times. Despite this, he is good-natured and liked by the other adults in the series. 
 Belinda Bear (voiced by Zara Siddiqi in her first episode and Charlotte Potterton since series 5)  Belinda is Dr. Brown Bear & Mummy Bear's daughter and Baby Bear's sister, and Chloe Pig's friend. In the episode "Chloe's Big Friends", she calls herself "Be" for short. She wears a striped red and black dress.
 Mummy Bear aka Mrs. Bear (voiced by Morwenna Banks)  Mummy Bear is Dr. Brown Bear's wife and Belinda & Baby Bear's mother.
 Baby Bear  Baby Bear is Dr. Brown Bear & Mummy Bear's son and Belinda's brother. He wears a yellow shirt. He is the same age as George and made his first appearance in the episode "The Bedtime Story".
 Penny Polar Bear (voiced by Mabel Green) is in Peppa's playgroup and has two mothers - Mummy Polar Bear (Judy Flynn) and Dr Polar Bear (Jen Pringle), who works with Dr Brown Bear. It is also presumed that Mummy Polar Bear is Penny's biological mother and Dr. Polar Bear is Penny's step-mother.

The Donkeys
 Delphine Donkey (voiced by Nzilani Franq)  Delphine is Monsieur & Mummy Donkey's daughter, Didier's sister, Madame Gazelle's penpal and Peppa's friend from France. She does not natively speak English but can speak French very well. She is Didier's older sister.
 Didier Donkey (voiced by Aurélie Charbonnier)  Didier is Monsieur & Mummy Donkey's son and Delphine's brother. He has a toy dragon, similar to how George has a toy dinosaur. He wears an orange shirt.
 Monsieur Donkey (voiced by Jerome Haupert in series 2-3 and David Rintoul since series 5)  Monsieur is Mummy Donkey's husband and Delphine & Didier's father. He has a French accent and a small moustache and can fluently speak English and French. 
 Mummy Donkey aka Mrs. Donkey  Mummy Donkey is Monsieur's wife and Delphine and Didier's mother.

The Pandas
 Police Officer Panda (voiced by David Mitchell)  Police Officer Panda is Peggi and Pandora's father and Mummy Panda's husband who is a talented but somewhat clumsy policeman. He first appeared in the Series 5 episode "The Police". He also "talks like a policeman", always saying "Ello, Ello, Ello!" when he greets someone. He enjoys eating donuts and works with Police Officer Squirrel.
 Peggi and Pandora Panda (voiced by Chelsey Orfinada)  Peggi & Pandora are Police Officer Panda's twin children. They enjoy puzzles and games that require investigating or solving a mystery due to their father's work. Pandora wears a dark yellow dress and Peggi wears a red dress.
 Mummy Panda aka Mrs. Panda (voiced by Morwenna Banks)  Mummy Panda is Peggi and Pandora's mother and Police Officer Panda's wife. She was a background character in some episodes until she makes her debut as a main character in "Families". She wears a light pink dress and black shoes. She is also a member of the "Mummies' Fire Service" as revealed in the same episode she debuted as a main character.

The Squirrels
 Simon Squirrel (voiced by Preston Nyman in series 3 and Otto Hall in series 7)  Simon is Police Officer Squirrel's son and Chloe's friend. In the episode "Chloe's Big Friends", he calls himself "Si" for short. His parents have never appeared in the show but it is assumed that they are squirrels, like him.
 Police Officer Squirrel (voiced by Judy Flynn)  Police Officer Squirrel is Simon's mother who first appeared in the S5 episode "The Police". She enjoys eating donuts and her work with Police Officer Panda.

The Mice
 Mandy Mouse (voiced by Audrey van Hulzen)  Mandy is Mummy Mouse's daughter and Peppa's friend who wears a rose dress and uses a wheelchair. She is first introduced in an episode of her name. Her father is mentioned in Valentine's Day.
 Mummy Mouse aka Mrs. Mouse (voiced by Morwenna Banks)  Mummy Mouse is Mandy's mother who is seen in Mandy's debut episode.
 Daddy Mouse aka Mr. Mouse (voiced by John Sparkes)  Daddy Mouse is Mandy Mouse's father and Mummy Mouse's husband who is first mentioned in the episode Valentine's Day. He hasn't made a physical appearance in the series yet, Until his debut in "Families" He wears an indigo shirt like Daddy Cat and black shoes.

The Gazelles
 Madame Gazelle (voiced by Morwenna Banks and Nanique Gheridan in the US Cartoon Network version)  Madame Gazelle is the teacher at and owner of Peppa's playgroup. She has a French accent, which is a pun on "mademoiselle". She once played in a rock band called "The Rocking Gazelles" with two other gazelles who may be her sisters, as evidenced in "Madame Gazelle's Leaving Party". She taught Peppa's parents when they were children. "In Pumpkin Party" it is implied that she is a vampire because she has no reflection in the mirror, and seeing Suzy dressed as a vampire reminds her of the old country. In the episode, "Madame Gazelle's House", it is shown that bats are her old friends.It also may be that she is a vampire because when she taught the parents of the children, she was the same age as she is now. In the episode "Madame Gazelle's Leaving Party", her first name is revealed to be Gigi. She is the only seen adult character whose first name was revealed (but only once). She can play both electric and acoustic guitars, as shown in many episodes.
 Glenda Gazelle – She is the bass guitarist in Madame Gazelle's rock band "The Rocking Gazelles". She appears in the episodes "Madame Gazelle's Leaving Party" and "Muddy Festival". Her name is revealed in the audio story version of "Madame Gazelle's Leaving Party".
 Greta Gazelle – She is the drummer in Madame Gazelle's rock band "The Rocking Gazelles". She appears in the episodes "Madame Gazelle's Leaving Party" and "Muddy Festival". Her name is revealed in the audio story version of "Madame Gazelle's Leaving Party".

The Cows/Bulls
 Carol Cow (originally going to be voiced by Camille Hyde)  Carol Cow is Mrs. Cow and Mr. Bull's daughter and Grandma Cow's granddaughter. She wears a baby blue dress and black dress.
 Mrs. Cow (voiced by Judy Flynn)  Mrs. Cow is a member of the "Mummies' Fire Service". She is Mr. Bull's wife, Grandma Cow's daughter and Carol Cow's mother. Not much is known about her, but she share some similarities with Mummy Zebra.
 Mr. Bull (voiced by David Rintoul)  Mr. Bull is a garbage man, a construction worker (his most famous quote from this job is “We dig up the road!”), a nurse (as seen in episode "The Hospital") and a tuba player. Mr. Bull is also a taxi driver (as seen in "Flying on Holiday"). He is also the husband of Mrs. Cow, the son in-law of Grandma Cow and the father of Carol Cow.
 Grandma Cow (voiced by Morwenna Banks)  Grandma Cow is Mrs. Cow's mother, Mr. Bull's mother in-law, and Carol Cow's grandmother. She wears a forest green dress and black shoes.

The Rhinos
 Ronald Rhinoceros (originally going to be voiced by Brennan Mejia)  Ronald is Rohan, Riley, and Reese Rhinoceros's brother, Grandpa Rhinoceros's first grandson and Mr. and Mrs. Rhinoceros's first son. He wears a dark red shirt and black shoes.
 Rohan Rhinoceros (voiced by Giaan Virdee)  Rohan is Ronald, Riley, and Reese Rhinoceros's brother, Grandpa Rhinoceros's second grandson and Mr. and Mrs. Rhinoceros's second son. He wears a light green shirt and black shoes.
 Reese Rhinoceros (voiced by Carolyn Lawrence)  Reese is Ronald, Riley, and Rohan Rhinoceros's sister and Mr. and Mrs. Rhinoceros's daughter. She wears a baby pink dress and black shoes. Her name is uncredited in the credits.
 Riley Rhinoceros (voiced by Bill Fagerbakke)  Riley is Ronald, Rohan, and Reese's older brother, Grandpa Rhinoceros's older grandson and Mr. and Mrs. Rhinoceros's older son. He wears baby blue clothes like Carol Cow and black shoes. His name is uncredited in the credits.
 Mrs. Rhinoceros (voiced by Lori Alan)  Mrs. Rhinoceros debuted in 3 episodes which are "Holiday on the Sea", "Tropical Day Trip", and "Sailing Home". She wears a light pink dress and black or white shoes. Her name is uncredited in the credits.
 Mr. Rhinoceros (voiced by John Sparkes)  Mr. Rhinoceros works with Mr. Bull in the building/construction jobs. His name is uncredited in the credits.
 Grandpa Rhinoceros (voiced by Sam Simmons Grandpa Rhinoceros is Mr. Rhinoceros's father, Mrs. Rhinoceros's father in-law and Ronald, Rohan, and Reese's grandfather. He wears a greenish brown shirt and black shoes. His name is credited as "Elderly Rhinoceros" in the credits rather than his actual name.

Other characters 
 Mr. Potato (voiced by John Sparkes)  Mr. Potato is Peppa's favourite character from a TV show. It is unknown if he is a real potato or someone wearing a costume. He encourages the kids to exercise and eat healthy. His friends are Mrs. Carrot, Sweet Cranberry and Little Sprout who are also real fruit and vegetables, as evidenced in "Mr. Potato's Christmas Show". There is also a Mrs. Potato, appearing only on Peppa's television with Mr. Potato from series one until the beginning of series 3.
 Super Potato (voiced by Alexander Armstrong)  Super Potato is a fictional TV superhero which Peppa and her friends watch unsure if he is real or someone wearing a costume. He also gives the kids good health advice. He likes to sing, "Fruits and vegetables keep us alive, always remember to eat your five", referring to the amount of servings of fruit and vegetables that were previously recommended (the number is now seven, as one of the children will inevitably remind Super Potato, who corrects himself).
 Mrs. Carrot (voiced by Morwenna Banks)  Mrs. Carrot appears as a member of the Christmas Vegetable Family alongside Mr. Potato, Sweet Cranberry and Little Sprout, in the episode "Mr. Potato's Christmas Show" and also appears in the episode "Fruit".
 Little Sprout (voiced by Philippa Prosser)  Little Sprout appears as a member of the Christmas Vegetable Family in the episode "Mr. Potato's Christmas Show" and also appears in the episode "Fruit".
 Sweet Cranberry  Sweet Cranberry appears as a member of the Christmas Vegetable Family in the episode "Mr. Potato's Christmas Show" and also appears in the episode "Fruit".
 Dr. Hamster (voiced by Morwenna Banks)  Dr. Hamster is a vet and has a tortoise named Tiddles who gets stuck in trees a lot. She flies an airplane on "The Flying Vet".
 Mr. Labrador (voiced by David Graham in series 3–5 and Al Murrey since series 6)  Mr. Labrador works with Mr. Bull in the building/construction jobs. He also runs the archery competition at the fair (as seen in "Funfair") and sells Ice Cream in his van.
 Captain Emergency (voiced by Dominic Byrne)  Captain Emergency is the pilot on the plane Peppa and her family fly on in the episode "Flying on Holiday".
 Policeman Stag (voiced by Fernando Tiberini)  Policeman Stag appears in the episodes "The Holiday House", "Holiday in the Sun" and "The End of the Holiday" to return Teddy to Peppa who kept losing it. He is a dark brown otter.
 Father Christmas (voiced by David Graham, but credited as "himself")  Father Christmas appears in episodes "Santa's Grotto", "Santa's Visit", "Mr. Potato's Christmas Show" and "Father Christmas. He is one of 3 human characters in the show, the other ones are the Queen and the pirate Dog Beard. He is alternatively referred to as Father Christmas and Santa.
 The Queen (voiced by Morwenna Banks)  The Queen appears in the episodes "The Queen" and "London". The character is based on Queen Elizabeth II of the United Kingdom. She is a friend of Miss Rabbit. She is also very jolly. The fate of the character is currently unknown due to Queen Elizabeth's death.
 Mr. Lion (voiced by Colin McFarlane)  Mr. Lion appears in the episode "The Zoo" as the primary zookeeper. He calls Madame Gazelle "Mrs. Wildebeest" and often intimidates her, since both are natural prey to lions.
 Mrs. Crocodile (voiced by Jo Brand)  Mrs. Crocodile appears in the S5 episode "The Zoo" as the zookeeper responsible for the penguins. She also intimidates Madame Gazelle somewhat.
 Mr. Wallaby (voiced by Sam Simmons)  Mr. Wallaby is the Kangaroos' neighbor, who is described as very nice. He appears in the S5 episode "Boomerang".
 Mr. Stallion (voiced by John Sparkes)  Mr. Stallion is Grandpa Pig's friend. He appears in the S5 episode "Sailing Boat". His name is uncredited in the credits.
 Mrs. Corgi (voiced by Morwenna Banks)  Mrs. Corgi is Grandpa Pig's friend. She appears in the S5 episode "Sailing Boat". Her name is uncredited in the credits.
 King Alfonso (voiced by David Graham)  King Alfonso appears in the S5 episode "Long Train Journey" He has a thick Italian accent. He is shown to be less honoured than Daddy Pig.

Pets and animals

The Fishes
 Goldie the Fish  Goldie is Peppa's pet fish. 
 Ginger the Fish  Ginger is Miss Rabbit's pet fish and is shown in "The Aquarium" where he befriends Peppa's fish Goldie.

Others
 Tiddles  Tiddles is Dr. Hamster's pet tortoise. He is 33 as shown the episode "Dr. Hamster's Tortoise". He is known to climb trees as shown in "Doctor Hamster's Tortoise" and often sneak away from Dr. Hamster.
 Steven  Steven is Pedro Pony's pet stick insect who is shown in "Pedro the Cowboy" and "The Pet Competition".
 Jemima, Sarah, Vanessa & Neville  They are Granny Pig's chickens who annoy Grandpa Pig. In the episode "Spring", they have some chicks.
 Hemidactylus frenatus  He is Edmond's pet gecko and is shown the episode "The Pet Competition". His name is the scientific name of the common house gecko. Edmond named him this because he is a clever clogs.
 Polly Parrot (voiced by Alison Snowden)  Polly is Granny and Grandpa Pig's pet parrot. Like most parrots, Polly copies what others say. She is not in series 5, but returned in series 6. 
 Mrs. Duck  Mrs. Duck is a wild duck who lives in the duck pond with the other ducks. She and her fellow ducks have a habit of always showing up at picnics, usually in the hope of receiving food scraps, and often appears in unusual places to reach the picnic, such as the top of a mountain. She appears in the episode "The Golden Boots” special when she takes Peppa's golden boots.
 Mrs. Duck-Billed Platypus  Mrs. Duck-Billed Platypus is a wild duck-billed platypus who appears in the episode "The Outback". She appears when Peppa and her family are having a barbecue picnic with the Kangaroo family in the Australian Outback, after Peppa remarks that Mrs. Duck always shows up when they have picnics.
 Mr. Skinnylegs  Mr. Skinnylegs is a friendly little spider who lives in and around Peppa's house, at times covering the place with his cobwebs. He was named by Peppa as he has long legs.

References

Peppa Pig
Peppa Pig
Television characters introduced in 2004